The French Belgian Sign Language (LSFB) is the deaf sign language of the French language Community of Belgium, a country in Western Europe. It and Flemish Sign Language are very closely related (and distantly if at all related to French Sign Language, but generally regarded today as distinct languages.

Legal recognition
By decree of 22 October 2003, the Parliament of the French Community recognised the Sign Language of French-speaking Belgium.

See also 
 Signed French

References

External links
 www.lsfb.be  – Langue des signes de Belgique francophone
 www.cfls.be – Centre Francophone de la Langue des Signes
 www.sourdlang.be – dictionary

Sign languages
Languages of Belgium
French Sign Language family